Alexandra Razarenova (or Razaryonova, born 17 July 1990 in Saint Petersburg) is a Russian professional triathlete, member of the Russian National Elite Team, Russian Elite Champion of the year 2011, and European U23 Champion of the year 2011. She competed in the women's event at the 2012 Summer Olympics, 2016 Summer Olympics and 2020 Summer Olympics.

Sports career 
Razarenova attended an elite sports school in St. Petersburg (Училище олимпийского резерва № 1) and started her international career in 2005 when, at the age of 15, she took part in an ITU Elite race in Alanya.
From 2006 to 2009, she attended five Junior European Cup triathlons and always achieved top ten positions, among which three gold medals.
In 2009, she placed 4th in the Junior European Championships and 5th in the Junior World Championships.
In 2010, she placed 5th in the U23 World Championships and in 2011 she won the U23 European Championships.
From 2010 on Razarenova has represented Russia in the World Championship Series. In the World Championship Series Rankings 2011 she was number 62 and thus the second best Russian female triathlete behind Irina Abysova.

French Club Championship Series 
In 2011, Razarenova also took part in the prestigious Club Championship Series D1 Lyonnaise des Eaux representing Charleville Tri Ardennes (CTA). In Paris (9 July 2011), Razarenova placed 16th (CTA's three triathlètes classants l'equipe being Emma Moffatt, Sarah Groff and Anja Dittmer), at the Grand Final in La Baule (17 September 2011) she placed 6th and was the best athlete of her club. For the triathlon in Tours there are no individual rankings available and at the opening triathlon in Nice (24 April 2011) Razarenova did not start (DNS), i.e. her club should have been disqualified because there were not five triathletes participating in the race but only four (Holland, Rabie, Delphine Py-Bilot, Letot).

ITU Competitions 
In the six years from 2005 to 2010, Razarenova took part in 27 ITU competitions and achieved 16 top ten positions.

The following list is based upon the official ITU rankings and the ITU Athletes's Profile Page. Unless indicated otherwise, the following events are triathlons (Olympic Distance) and refer to the Elite category.

DNF = did not finish • DNS = did not start • DQ = disqualified

References

External links 
 Website of the Russian Triathlon Federation

Russian female triathletes
1990 births
Living people
Olympic triathletes of Russia
Triathletes at the 2012 Summer Olympics
Triathletes at the 2016 Summer Olympics
Triathletes at the 2015 European Games
European Games competitors for Russia
Triathletes at the 2020 Summer Olympics
20th-century Russian women
21st-century Russian women